Following article contains a list of current and historical flags used to represent the districts of the city of Warsaw, Poland, as well as its other historical subdivisions.

Current flags

Białołęka 

The flag of the Białołęka is divided horizontally into three stripes of the same width. They are, from top to bottom, light green, yellow, and red. The flag colours are inspired by the district coat of arms. The green colour symbolizes hope, happiness, and honour, yellow (golden) colour, nobleness, kindness, and intelligence, and the red colour, the bravery, and valor. The aspect ratio of the flag proportions, of its height to width, is 5:8. Despite that, the district also uses the flag wit the proportions of around 15:28. The flag was adopted on 28 April 1995 as the symbol of Gmina Warsaw-Białołęka, which was replaced by the district of Białołęka on 27 October 2002. Białołęka continues to use the flag to the present day.

Rembertów 

The flag of the Rembertów is divided into four fields, that were of red and yellow colour, placed in the checkboard pattern. They are placed in two horizontal rows, with the fields on the left having the width of 1/3 of the flag width. The top left, and bottom right fields are yellow, while the top right, and bottom left fields, red. The colours are based on the yellow and red flag of Warsaw. In coat of arms and flag of Rembertów, the yellow colour symbolizes the sands of the dessert near Warsaw, and red symbolizes the blood of people who fought in Rembertów during World War II. The aspect ratio of the flag proportion of its height to its width, is 2:3 (1:1.5). The flag was established on 7 February 1996, as the symbol of Gmina Warsaw-Rembertów, which on 27 October 2002, was replaced by the district of Rembertów, which continues to use the flag present day.

Ursynów 

The flag of Ursynów is a divided into three horizontal stripes, that were, from the top to bottom, navy blue, yellow, and red. The yellow and red stripes reference the flag of Warsaw, while meaning behind the blue stripe is unknown. The aspect ratio of flag propotions, of its height to its width, is described in the establishing resolution as 100:99, although in practice, such proportions are not used. Instead, the flag is usually given a shape of a wider rectangle, with the proportions of 5:8. The proportion of the stripes to each other are described as equal 26:7:7, however, those proportion also remain unused in practice. Instead, the flag is usually presented with the blue stripe two times bigger than the remaining two stripes, with the proportion equal 2:1:1. The flag was adopted on 14 February 1995, as the symbol of Gmina Warsaw-Ursynów, which on 27 October 2002, was replaced by the district of Ursynów, which continues to use the flag present day.

Former municipal flags (1994–2002) 
In 1994, the city of Warsaw was divided into ten gminas (municipalities), which following their creation, begun establishing their symbols, including flags. Out of ten, six municipalities had adopted flag designs. They were: Warsaw-Bielany, Warsaw-Rembertów, Warsaw-Targówek, Warsaw-Ursus, Warsaw-Ursynów, and Warsaw-Wawer. The municipalities of Warsaw-Centre, and Warsaw-Wilanów did not adopt any flag design, while municipalities of Warsaw-Bemowo, and Warsaw-Włochy, stated in legal documents some bare descriptions of flag designs, which however were not intelligible, and such, not used. The municipalities existed until 27 October 2002, when they were replaced by the district. Most of them did not continued to use the flags of the predecessors, with the expetions of the few of them.

Bemowo 

The Gmina Warsaw-Bemowo never had its own flag. However, the resolution from 11 January 1996 establishing the municipal coat of arms, stated that the "gmina (municipil) coat of arms should be placed on the flags, and next to the official names of the gmina (municipilaty)". It remains unknown how such statement was meant to be interpreted. The municipal council had begun the process of designing the flag, however it was cancelled, and the municipality never had established any proper flag. On 27 October 2002, the municipality ceased to exist, and was replaced by the district of Bemowo.

Białołęka 

The flag of the Gmina Warsaw-Białołęka was divided horizontally into three stripes of the same width. They were, from top to bottom, light green, yellow, and red. The flag colours were inspired by the municipal coat of arms. The green colour symbolizes hope, happiness, and honour, yellow (golden) colour, nobleness, kindness, and intelligence, and the red colour, the bravery, and valor. The flag was adopted on 28 April 1995. On 27 October 2002, the municipality ceased to exist and was replaced by the district of Białołęka, which continues to use the flag to the present day.

Bielany 

The flag of the Gmina Warsaw-Bielany was divided horizontally into three stripes of the same width. They were yellow on top, and red on bottom, which were the same colours, as those of the flag of Warsaw. According to the illustration attached to the establishing law resolution, the aspect ratio of the flag proportion of its height to its width, were 53:103 (1:1.94). Despite that, the flag flown at the municipal hall building had been noted to have its proportions more closer to 2:3. The flag of Warsaw, after which this flag had been based, did not have specified proportions. The flag of Gmina Warsaw-Bielany was adopted on 16 December 1995. On 27 October 2002, the municipality ceased to exist, and was replaced by the district of Bielany.

Rembertów 

The flag of the Gmina Warsaw-Rembertów was divided into four fields, that were of red and yellow colour, placed in the checkboard pattern. They were placed in two horizontal rows, with the fields on the left having the width of 1/3 of the flag width. The top left, and bottom right fields were yellow, while the top right, and bottom left fields, red. The colours were based on the yellow and red flag of Warsaw. In coat of arms and flag of Rembertów, the yellow colour symbolizes the sands of the nearby dessert near Warsaw, and red symbolizes the blood of people who fought in Rembertów during World War II. There were two different flag proportion stated in different documents. According to the illustration attached to the establishing law resolution, the aspect ratio of the flag proportion of its height to its width, was 2:3 (1:1.5), while, according to the municipal by-law, the proportions were 22:41 (1:1.86). The flag was established on 7 February 1996. On 27 October 2002, the municipality ceased to exist, and was replaced by the district of Rembertów, which continues to use the flag to the present day.

Targówek 

The flag of the Gmina Warsaw-Targówek was divided into three horizontal stripes of the equal width. They were, from top to bottom, white, yellow, and red. The colours were the same, as those of the coat of arms, and it was stated by the municipality, that said colours were choses for the flag, as white and red are used in the flag of Poland, and yellow, and red, in the flag of Warsaw. The flag was adopted on 13 November 1997. In 2002, the municipality ceased to exist, and was replaced by the district of Targówek.

Ursus 

The flag of Gmina Warsaw-Ursus was divided into four horizontal stripes. Of which, top and bottom stripes, were of the same height, which was the 1/3 of the height of the flag. The two stripes in the middle, had the height of the 1/6 of the height of the flag, each. The colours of the stripes, from top to bottom, were: green, yellow, red, and green. The flag was originally introduced in the resolution from 20 December 1996, which however was not approved, due to the opposition by the voivode of the Warsaw Voivodeship, how argued that legally, gminas (municipalities) were not permitted to have their own flags. Such decision was contested by the municipality, which eventually led to the Supreme Administrative Court of Poland siding with the voivode's decision, in the hearing on 31 January 1997. Despite that, using the legal loopholes, the municipality adopted the design on 29 April 1997, in the municipal by-law, in which, the design was referred to as the "colours of the municipality", instead of a "flag".

In the original 1996 resolution, there was also introduced the design of the flag of municipality mayor, which depicted a brown bear standing on its back feet, holding a yellow halberd, placed in the flag centre, on a green background. The flag was a banner of arms of the municipal coat of arms. However, said flag was not reintroduced by the municipality in its 1997 by-law.

On 27 October 2002, the municipality ceased to exist, and was replaced by the district of Ursus.

Ursynów 

The flag of Gmina Warsaw-Ursynów was a divided into three horizontal stripes, that were, from the top to bottom, navy blue, yellow, and red. The yellow and red stripes referenced the flag of Warsaw, while meaning behind the blue stripe were unknown. The aspect ratio of flag propotions, of its  height to its width, was described in the establishing resolution as 100:99, although in practice, such proportions were not used. Instead, the flag was usually given a shape of a wider rectangle, with the proportions of 5:8. The proportion of the stripes to each other were described as equal 26:7:7, however, those proportion also remain unused in practice. Instead, the flag is usually presented with the blue stripe two times bigger than the remaining two stripes, with the proportion equal 2:1:1. On 27 October 2002, the municipality ceased to exist, and was replaced by the district of Ursynów.

Wawer 

The flag of Gmina Warsaw-Wawer, was divided vertically into three stripes. The middle stripe was red, and had the width of 3/5 of the flag's width. On both sides of the flag were yellow stripes, and each having the width of 1/5 of the flag's width. In the flag centre, was placed a frayed yellow letter W, with the height of the half of the flag's height. The aspect ratio of the flag proportion of its height to its width, was 5:8. The letter W commemorates the Wawer massacre, during which, on the night of 26 to 27 December 1939, 107 Polish civilians were executed by Nazi Germany officers, in the occupied Wawer, and the inscriptions "Wawer pomścimy" (from Polish: we will revenge Wawer), that were written on the building walls by inhabitants of Warsaw, following the massacre. The yellow and red are the colours of the flag of Warsaw. The flag was adopted on 28 December 1999. In 2002, the municipality ceased to exist, and was replaced by the district of Wawer.

Włochy 
The Gmina Warsaw-Włochy never had its own flag. However, the municipal by-law established on 16 February 1996, stated that the "gmina (municipility) uses the coat of arms and city colours [...], marked with the name 'Warsaw-Włochy'". It remains unknown how such statement was meant to be interpreted. In 2002, the municipality ceased to exist, and was replaced by the district of Włochy.

Former 1960s flags 
In the early 1960s, around year 1961, the 7 districts of Warsaw, begun unofficially using the flags, during the Spartakiad sport events in the city. Those were: Mokotów, Ochota, Praga-Południe, Praga-Północ, Śródmieście, Wola, and Żoliborz. There is not any known legal
document establishing their usage. Despite that, the flags were occasionally used by the district outside the sport events. Eventually, the flags were phased out.

Mokotów 

The flag of Mokotów consisted of four fields. It was divided in half diagonally by two stripes of equal wight, yellow and red, going from top right to bottom left corners of the flag. The remaining triangular field on the left was white, while the field on the right, dark blue. Yellow and red were the colours of the flag of Warsaw.

Ochota 

The flag of Ochota consisted of a green diagonal stripe going from the right left to the right bottom corner of the flag, placed on a white background.

Praga-Południe 

The flag of Praga-Południe consisted of a yellow background, with a red stripe placed in the bottom left corner, with the wight of 2/3 of the flag, and half the height of the flag. Yellow and red were the colours of the flag of Warsaw.

Praga-Północ 

The flag of Praga-Północ consisted of a black diagonal stripe going from the right left to the right bottom corner of the flag, placed on a white background.

Śródmieście 

The flag of Śródmieście was divided into three fields. It included two vertical stripes of equal height, a white stripe on the top, and red stripe on the bottom. To the lest side was attached via its base, a isosceles triangle, which extended to the around 1/3 of the flag wight. In the centre of the white stripe was placed a coat of arms designed to be similar to the coat of arms of Warsaw. It consisted of a red Polish-style escutcheon (shield), with a beige mermaid facing left, holding a golden sword above her head, in her right hand, and a circular golden shield near her chest, in her left hand. White and red were the colours of the flag of Poland, while, yellow and red, of the flag of Warsaw.

Wola 

The flag of Wola was divided into horizontal three stripes. The top red stripe had the half of the height of the flag. Two bottom stripes were white and red, and each of them had the height of 1/4 of the flag. White and red were the colours of the flag of Poland.

Żoliborz 

The flag of Żoliborz was divided into three horizontal stripes of equal wight. They were, from top to bottom: white, green, and white. In the top left corner of the flag was placed a green letter Z with stroke (Ƶ), which had a from of a letter Z, with a vertical bar (line) placed in the middle of its height middle, as parallel to the top and bottom lines forming the letter. In Polish, said letter is used as the alternative spelling of the letter Z with overdot (Ż), which is the first letter in the name of the district.

Other former flags

Wesoła 
 
On 1 January 2002, the towns of Wesoła and Sulejówek, were incorporated into the Warsaw County, which apport of them, consisted of the city of Warsaw. Wesoła continued to be part of the county until 27 October 2002, when the county was diestablished and replaced by the city of Warsaw, and Wesoła becoming the district of Warsaw.

The flag of Wesoła was divided diagonally into two fields, with the dividing line going from the bottom left to the top right corners. The left field was white, and the right field, red. In the white field, near the right top corner, was placed a yellow circle, its top portion cut on the top edge of the flag. The flag was officially adopted in 1999, though, it was already used unofficially before that.

Sulejówek 

On 1 January 2002, the towns of Sulejówek and Wesoła, were incorporated into the Warsaw County, which apport of them, consisted of the city of Warsaw. On 27 October 2002 the county ceased to existed, and Sulejówek was incorporated into nearby Mińsk County.

The flag of Sulejówek is divided into four horizontal stripes. The top and bottom stripes are light blue, and has the height of 2/5 of the flag's height. The two middle stripes are white and yellow, and each of them has the height of 1/10 of the flag. The colours were adopted from the town coat of arms of arms. The light blue was the colour of the dress uniform of Józef Piłsudski, Chief of State of Poland from 1918 to 1922. The flag was adopted in 2000.

References 

Warsaw, district
Warsaw, district
Warsaw, district
flags
flags, district
flags, district
flags, district